Thomas Harrison was an English architect who flourished in the last two decades of the 18th century and the first three decades of the 19th century.  Little is known of his early life, and his precise date of birth is not known. He was born in Richmond, Yorkshire, and was baptised on 7 August 1744. In 1769 he was sent to study architecture in Rome.  He started his professional life as an architect in 1782. This followed his success in a competition to design Skerton Bridge in Lancaster, Lancashire, as a result of which he moved to  Lancaster. While there he carried out a number of projects, including a new tower and spire for St John's Church, a clock tower for the town hall, and new buildings within the complex of Lancaster Castle. While he was working on Lancaster Castle, he was also involved in the design of new buildings within Chester Castle, Cheshire. In 1795, Harrison moved with his family to Chester, where he spent the rest of his career. Following his success with Skerton Bridge, Harrison designed more bridges, including Harrington Bridge in Derbyshire, St Mary's Bridge in Derby, Stramongate Bridge in Kendal, Cumbria, and smaller bridges in Lancashire, and Cheshire.

Harrison is considered to have been a leader of Greek Revival architecture in the northwest of England. His major surviving works in this style include the Lyceum in Liverpool, the Portico Library in Manchester, and the Commercial Newsroom in Chester. Most of Harrison's works are in Lancashire and Cheshire, but he also designed buildings in North Wales, and in Shropshire. His only work away from this part of the country was his design for the New Buildings at Magdalen College, Oxford. In Chester, Harrison designed a house for himself, St Martin's Lodge. In addition to domestic and civic buildings, he worked on memorial structures, including the Jubilee Tower on Moel Famau in North Wales, Lord Hill's Column in Shrewsbury, Shropshire, and a memorial gateway in Holyhead, Anglesey.  His final major designs were for two bridges in Chester. In 1825–26 he widened the Old Dee Bridge. He then designed a new bridge, the Grosvenor Bridge. This was not completed until after his death in 1829, but it was at the time the largest structure of its type in the world.

Key

Works

References

Bibliography
 
 
 
 
 
 
 
 
 
 
 

Lists of buildings and structures by architect